The May 2018 inter-Korean summit was the second inter-Korean summit in 2018.
On 26 May, North Korean state chairman Kim Jong-un and South Korean president Moon Jae-in met again in the joint Security Area, this time on the North Korean side in the Inter-Korean Peace House in the Unification Pavilion. The meeting took two hours, and unlike other summits it had not been publicly announced beforehand. Photos released by South Korea's presidential office showed Moon arriving at the northern side of the Panmunjom truce village and shaking hands with Kim's sister, Kim Yo-jong, before sitting down with Kim for their summit. Moon was accompanied by Suh Hoon, Director of the National Intelligence Service of South Korea,  while Kim was joined by Kim Yong-chol, a former military intelligence chief who is now a vice chairman of the North Korean ruling party's central committee tasked with inter-Korean relations. The meeting was largely centered around North Korean leader Kim Jong-un's upcoming summit with US President Donald Trump. Kim and Moon also embraced before Moon returned to South Korea. On 27 May, Moon stated in a public address that he and Kim agreed to meet again at "anytime and anyplace" without any formality and that the North Korean leader once again pledged to denuclearize the Korean Peninsula in accordance with the Panmunjom Declaration.

Agenda

The two leaders of North and South Koreas exchanged their opinions about the issues and solutions for the Trump–Kim summit, as Trump abruptly cancelled the upcoming US–North Korea summit on 12 June. The principal agenda of the meeting was trying to get the US summit back on track and keep progressing the denuclearization talks.

Meeting

The second 2018 summit was established by Kim Jong-un's suggestion within a whirlwind 24 hour notice, but Moon Jae-in accepted Kim's invitation  as per the critical nuclear agenda between North and South Korea. Moon had expressed his belief, and he discussed with Kim Jong-un about Kim's willingness to join nuclear interventions with Trump. Moon and Kim agreed to also convene inter-Korean high-level talks on 1 June, to be followed by talks between military authorities to ease military tensions and Red Cross talks for the reunion of separated families. Both leaders also agreed to accelerate the implementation of the Panmunjom Declaration and meet again at "anytime and anyplace" without formality.

Aftermath

During the 1 June meeting, officials from both countries agreed to move forward with the military and Red Cross talks. Both Koreas also agreed to reopen a liaison office located within a factory park in Kaesong which had been jointly operated by the countries as an economic zone until the South shut it down in February 2016 after a North Korean nuclear test. The first talks involving the Red Cross and military were then held at North Korea's Mount Kumgang resort on 22 June 2018 and during the talks, it was agreed that family reunions which had been cancelled in 2015 would resume between 20 and 26 August 2018.

The first family unions since the end of the Korean War then took place on 20 August when about 330 South Koreans from 89 families, many in wheelchairs, embraced 185 separated relatives from the North at the Mount Kumgang resort, also known as Diamond Mountain. South Korean members of these families returned home on August 22. Between August 24 and August 26, a second round of family reunions occurred when a total of 326 South Koreans from 81 families traveled to Mount Kumgang to meet nearly 100 of their long-separated relatives from the North. On 14 September, the Inter-Korean Liaison Office opened at the Kaesong park location.

September 2018 Summit

On 13 August, it was announced that a third 2018 inter-Korean summit would be held in the North Korean capital of Pyongyang in September. The meeting is designed to capitalize on what was accomplished at the previous two summits. Ri Son-gwon, the head of the North Korean delegation, told reporters that a specific date for the summit was already set, but that they wanted to "keep reporters wondering." It was announced on 31 August that Moon would send a special delegation to North Korea on 5 September to hold more nuclear talks and set up the summit. The delegation arrived in North Korea as scheduled. It was determined that the summit would be held for three days and would take place between 18 and 20 September. The summit was officially held on the scheduled dates.

See also
 Inter-Korean summits
 April 2018 inter-Korean summit
 September 2018 inter-Korean summit
 2018 North Korea–United States Singapore Summit
 North Korea–South Korea relations
 Korean reunification
 Northern Limit Line
 2017–18 North Korea crisis
 Inter-Korean House of Freedom
 List of international trips made by Kim Jong-un
 Kim–Xi meetings

References

External links

2018 Inter-Korean Summit The official website of the 2018 Inter-Korean Summit
2018 Inter-Korean Summit The official website of the 2018 Inter-Korean Summit 
The full text of the agreement

2018 conferences
Inter-Korean summit
Inter-Korean summit
Inter-Korean summit
Aftermath of the Korean War
Inter-Korean summit
Kim Jong-un
Moon Jae-in Government
North Korea–South Korea relations
Politics of Korea
Panmunjom
Inter-Korean summit